Bertrix is a municipality of Wallonia located in the province of Luxembourg, Belgium. 

On 1 January 2007 the municipality, which covers 137.7 km², had 8,164 inhabitants, giving a population density of 59.3 inhabitants per km².

Bertrix is home to the NATO reserve Jehonville Air Base.

Geography 
The municipality consists of the following districts: Auby-sur-Semois, Bertrix, Cugnon, Jehonville, and Orgeo. 

Other population centers include:

Climate

Transport
Bertrix railway station, in the east of the town, has regular train services to Libramont, Dinant and Virton. On week-days trains run via Virton and Aubange to Arlon.

Twin towns
Bertrix is twinned with:
 Charmes (France) (since 1968)
 Rusca Montana (Romania) (since 1990)
 Church Point, Louisiana (United States) (since 1992)

Image gallery

See also
 List of protected heritage sites in Bertrix

References

External links
 

 
Municipalities of Luxembourg (Belgium)